Nineteen full expansions for the MMORPG EverQuest II have been released, as well as three Adventure Packs.

With EverQuest II, Sony Online Entertainment introduced the concept of Adventure Packs. Adventure Packs are meant to be smaller "mini-expansions" to the game, adding a plot line with several zones, new creatures and items to the game via digital download with a smaller fee. As time went on, however, the development team has decided to release free zones and content instead of including them in  Adventure Packs. Some recent releases include a new starting city, Neriak, with a new starting race, Arasai; and new high level dungeons The Throne of New Tunaria and the Estate of Unrest.

Until 2011, expansions were available in both DVD and digital formats, but can now be downloaded through a digital service. The digital versions often come with a bonus features such as a creature that the player can put in their in-game house. Expansions generally introduce many new zones with many plot lines, new features, many new creatures and items, new cities, and often come with a boost in the level cap or a new player race. While it may be easier to download the expansions digitally, traditional retail offers more content.

Expansion packs

Desert of Flames

Desert of Flames was the first expansion for EverQuest II. It featured a new land mass to explore, PvP arenas, a level increase from 50 to 60, a new climb ability and new items and monsters. The major quest line for the expansion is commonly known as "The Peacock Line" - This series of 17 or so quests culminates with a raid requiring the player to group up with his guildmates to slay an entity known as "The Godking".

Players can choose from a selection of rewards to be used in the weapon slot depending on their class, for example a mage would receive an item named "Wand of Second life" which can also be changed at will into a two-handed weapon - "Staff of Second life". This quest takes place throughout the Desert of Ro from the sinking sands to the living tombs and eventually the Silent City.

New zones include the Sinking Sands, Pillars of Flame, Clefts of Rujark and the dervish city of Maj'Dul. Also many instances such as Poets Palace and Shimmering Citadel are available with Desert of Flames.

Desert of Flames holds a 79% rating on GameRankings.

Kingdom of Sky

Kingdom of Sky featured a new region to explore, located high above the skies of Norrath, known as the Overrealm. It included a new level cap of 70 for adventurers and artisans, new items and quests, new monsters to fight, alternate ways of advancing your character (achievement points) and the ability to increase a guild to level 50.

Purchase of the expansion granted each character in any account that bought the expansion an Aviak hatchling.  If the expansion was bought in a brick and mortar store, the account was also granted one Carnivorous plant.  The Carnivorous Plant acts as a house pet which can be fed items from the world, and depending on what is fed to it, will yield a useful item.

The Overrealm is composed of floating islands which originate from the Plane of Sky.  Transportation to the Overrealm works like in The Shadows of Luclin; when a player wishes to go there, he or she obtains a teleportation shard from the overseer of a wizard spire on the ground.  The overseer NPC then grants to the player character a teleportation shard which flags the player as one wanting to go to the Overrealm.  Every five minutes, the spires activate, sending player characters to the Overrealm.  If a player originates in Antonica or the Commonlands, he or she will be sent to the Tenebrous Tangle.  If a player originates in the Thundering Steppes or Nektulos Forest, then he or she is sent to the Barren Sky.  If the player originates in the Enchanted Lands or the Feerrott, he or she is sent to the Bonemire.

As with both the original game and the first expansion, a new epic quest line is included called the "Claymore" line. The start of this quest line can be completed solo in the outdoor areas, however, it will soon require a group and many segments require large investments of time "camping" the required NPCs to spawn and gain quest updates. The last parts of this quest must be completed within a raid (a group of 7+ players), the first being in an area known as "Ascent of the Awakened" in which you must have two groups (12 players). The final part takes place in Deathtoll, a zone intended for four groups (24 players), and requires an epic access quest in itself to enter. In the end players got to choose from an archetype specific reward (in some cases there are multiple choices) which at the current time was some of the (arguably) best items in the game.

Once a player has installed this expansion pack and reaches adventuring level 10, a character is granted achievement experience through discovering new areas, finding precious treasure and status items, killing monsters with specific names, completing select quests, and completing certain collections of items.

Kingdom of Sky holds a 78% rating on GameRankings.

Echoes of Faydwer

Echoes of Faydwer introduced a new playable race (the Fae), the ability for player characters to equip visible cloaks, a second equipable earring slot, and add adornments (player-made enchantments) to existing items, 24 new subclass specific achievement trees, two new secondary tradeskill professions, and the return of the gods to the mortal realm.  It also introduced a new starting city, the tree city of Kelethin, along with new overland, dungeon, instance and raid zones. There are zones for all levels of characters in this expansion.

The expansion raised the achievement point cap to 100 and the guild level to 60. The expansion also included 6 new Heritage quests and new races to combat like the clockworks, kobolds and bugbears.

The boxed retail edition of Echoes of Faydwer includes the base game plus the first two expansions: Desert of Flames and Kingdom of Sky.

Echoes of Faydwer holds a 84% rating on GameRankings.

Rise of Kunark

Rise of Kunark is the fourth EverQuest II expansion pack. It introduces a new continent, Kunark; a new player race, the Sarnak; and raises the level cap for adventure, tradeskills and guilds to 80.

Added new Class specific AA Tab.

Rise of Kunark holds a 83% rating on Metacritic.

The Shadow Odyssey

The Shadow Odyssey is the fifth EverQuest II expansion pack. It contains content intended for levels 50–80. The expansion also gives access to all previous released expansions and adventure packs. The expansion introduces an additional achievement tree for each character class, 18 goal-based dungeons with a reward system for earning new equipment, new deities and raids.

Added new Shadows AA Tab with 4 lines - Common, Class type (Mages), archetype(Wizard/Warlocks), Class Specific (Wizard).

The Shadow Odyssey holds a 78% rating on Metacritic.

Sentinel's Fate

Sentinel's Fate is the sixth EverQuest II expansion pack. It raises the level cap from 80 to 90. The expansion also gives access to all previous released expansions and adventure packs. The expansion includes 2 new overland zones, 12 new dungeons, 400 new quests, over 2,000 more items, and hundreds of new monsters.

Added new AA options to Kingdom of Sky and Echo of Faydwer trees.

Michael Lafferty from GameZone.com gave it a score of 7/10. "Sentinel’s Fate may well be that interlude between exciting new content and compelling story elements that has been released as an expansion. It is the sixth overall expansion for the game (Adventure Packs don’t count; neither do live updates), and while it does add elements, it is lacking in that sense of adventure that has marked some earlier expansions." Nick Kolan from IGN gave the expansion a rating of 7.2 out of 10 and said "For my money, Sentinel’s Fate brings a good amount of content, but doesn’t do enough to truly excite."

Destiny of Velious

Destiny of Velious is the seventh EverQuest II expansion pack. The expansion also gives access to all previous released expansions and adventure packs. The expansion includes 2 new overland zones, 10 new dungeons, 300 new quests, over 1,000 more items, and more than 30 new monsters. The expansion also introduces flying mounts.

New archetype Heroic AA tab.

Age of Discovery

Age of Discovery is the eighth EverQuest II expansion pack. In tandem with the launch of this expansion, SOE also converted EQ2 into a fully free-to-play MMO. Free players were restricted in what they could access and utilize, while players were able to upgrade to "Silver" level membership for a small one-time fee to get more access. A "Gold" membership cost the same as the existing monthly subscription plan, and gave full access to all areas and features.

The expansion itself added the Beastlord class from the original EverQuest, new Reforging and Tradeskill Apprentice systems, hireable mercenary assistants, and the Dungeon Maker system allowing players to create their own shareable dungeons.

Chains of Eternity

Chains of Eternity is the ninth expansion to EverQuest II. This expansion contains features such as level increases, the Guild level cap raised to 95, Player level cap 95 and Tradeskill cap to 95, prestige abilities and game items only available in this expansion.

Prestige Abilities - Each subclass will get access to new Prestige Abilities!

Tears of Veeshan

Tears of Veeshan is the tenth expansion to EverQuest II. It features placing heroes among the dragon dead in the Eternal Broodlands.

AA limit increased to 340 and new Dragon tree added

Altar of Malice

Altar of Malice, the eleventh expansion pack, includes several new zones, one new playable race, several new avatars, new raids, and a raise in level cap to 100.

Added new prestige sub class tab.

Terrors of Thalumbra

Terrors of Thalumbra is the twelfth expansion pack to EverQuest II that was released on November 17, 2015. The expansion offers max-level characters a new underground zone for exploring and questing, new signature quest lines for both adventurers and crafters, new creatures, a large contested zone, and new dungeons (six advanced solo, 13 heroic, three x4 raids, and one x2 raid). The expansion also has content for those below level 100, including level-agnostic dungeons (scaling from levels 20 to 94), a revamped deity system, new best-in-slot relics, and a new item infusion upgrade system.

Kunark Ascending

Kunark Ascending is the thirteenth expansion pack to EverQuest II that was released on November 15, 2016. The expansion features 1 new overland zone, 12 new heroic zones, 8 solo zones, 4 advanced solo zones, 6 raid zones, over 50 solo quests, over 65 collection quests, an "Epic 2.0" signature quest for each adventure archetype, 4 new Ascension classes (a new way to customize combat), new tradeskill recipes and tradeskill signature quests, gear to upgrade mercenaries, a wardrobe feature to organize appearance gear, and updates to the combat UI (User Interface).

Planes of Prophecy

Planes of Prophecy is the fourteenth expansion pack to EverQuest II that was released on November 28, 2017.

 New dungeons for Solo, Heroic, and Raid players.
 Soulbound Weapons – A new weapon type that gains experience and levels up, increasing in power.
 Increased Level Cap – Adventure up to 110.
 Ascension Levels – Ascend to level 15.
 Mercenary Levels – Your mercenaries can level up to 10.
 Tradeskill Levels –  Craft up to 110.

Chaos Descending

Chaos Descending is the fifteenth expansion pack to EverQuest II and was released on November 13, 2018. Like the Planes of Prophecy, the story sees the player being tasked to restore order to the Elemental Planes which first appeared in the original EverQuests Planes of Power expansion. The content is focused primarily on four new outdoor zones: The Planes of Fire (Doomfire, the Burning Lands), Earth (Vegarlson, the Earthen Badlands), Air (Eryslai, the Kingdom of Wind), and Disease (Detroxxulous, the Plaguelands), as well as dungeon content based in the Plane of Water (Awuidor, the Unresting Waters) and a questing hub in the Plane of Knowledge (Myrist, The Great Library). Features include new quests for adventurers and crafters, new solo, heroic, and raid zones, and the ability to equip mounts and mercenaries with gear to gain added bonuses.

Two months leading to the release of the expansion, Daybreak Games launched an "Against the Elements" event in EverQuest II where players could take on quests revolving around rampaging elemental creatures. In their review of the expansion, MMORPG.com gave the game a 7.5 out of 10 rating. Writer Paul Eno commented that while it had a good amount of new content and a "fun and adventurous" story, he found that the new additions to the Ascension class system introduced in Kunark Ascending only added to the already high number of abilities characters had accumulated over the past several years and may put off new players. Combat was also seen as slow and "borders on monotony," which would be best experienced with a group rather than playing solo.

Blood of Luclin

Blood of Luclin was the sixteenth expansion pack for EverQuest II and was released on December 17, 2019. News of the expansion was revealed in an August 2019 news update on the game's official website, with the title formally announced on October 17. The story involves players returning to the moon of Luclin, the destruction of which originally led to the destruction of Norrath's surface. New features include an increased level cap from 110 to 120, new zones which include solo and raid content, and an "overseer" feature which allows the player to recruit agents to perform tasks.

Reign of Shadows

Reign of Shadows was the seventeenth expansion for EverQuest II. A continuation of the story of Blood of Luclin, the plot involves players returning to the dark side of the moon of Luclin to face the snake-like Shissar race led by Emperor Ssraeshza. The expansion features zones which first appeared in the original EverQuest expansion Shadows of Luclin in 2001, as well as the return of the cat-like Vah Shir as a playable race. New content includes new solo, raid, and quest areas along with a revamp of the Alternate Advancement character progression system. It was preceded by a beta test period in November 2020 with a final release the following December.

Visions of Vetrovia

Visions of Vetrovia is the eighteenth expansion for EverQuest II. It was announced on a website up on September 14, 2021 with an release date set for December 2021. Set after the events of the previous two expansions set on the moon of Luclin, Visions returns players to Norrath where Captain Douglan Wakerunner and the Far Seas Trading Company lead adventurers though the Shattered Sea seeking uncharted lands. It features an increased level cap to 125, new solo, heroic, and raid content, and adventure zones in the previously undiscovered land of Vetrovia. The release was preceded by an event which ran from September to October 2021 where players could earn increased loot drops, experience, and currency to prepare for the expansion itself.

Renewal of Ro

Renewal of Ro is the nineteenth expansion for EverQuest II. It was announced on the game's official website by producer Jenn Chan in September 2022 for release the following December, with that date eventually moved forward to November 30, 2022. The expansion features the return to the island of Ro where players will explore new zones located on its southern half while assisting the dragon-touched Aerakyn race. It features new areas, abilities, dungeons, and raids, as well as teleporters for fast travel. A pre-release in-game event, Secrets of the Sands, preceded its release beginning in September of that year.

Adventure packs

The Bloodline Chronicles

The Bloodline Chronicles is the first Adventure Pack for EverQuest II. It introduced new areas, new items and new monsters.

Five new areas, including the Tombs of Night, the Crypt of T'haen and D'Morte Burial Chambers.
Experience new instances for soloists, large and small groups and raids.
new creatures such as Vampires, Hellhounds, Fleshgoyles and Revenants.
new quests with different storylines for good and evil players alike.
ways to interact with the environment, including destructible walls
themed content, including vampiric magic-based spells and items.
Discover new Neriak items for players of all levels.

The Splitpaw Saga

The Splitpaw Saga is the second Adventure Pack for EverQuest II. It introduced new areas, new items and new monsters. The adventure pack allows characters to use moveable planks, crates and barrels in a series of event-based zones where they will face gnolls opponents designed for players between 20th and 50th level.

12 different solo, group and raid instances.
2 new dungeons with twelve additional instanced zones.
Dozens of scenario-based quests.
Foes scale to match the players' levels.

The Fallen Dynasty

The Fallen Dynasty is the third adventure pack. It introduced new areas, new items, new monsters and quest lines. It added new content for characters levels 55 through 70:
Seven areas to explore
New solo and small group quests lines, as well as heroic and epic encounters for levels 55 through 70.
Brand new collection and tome quests
new artisan rewards that assist in the crafting process
Many new items, including weapons designed in the Fallen Dynasty theme

Rum Cellar

Rum Cellar is a "campaign"-style adventure pack with a pirate theme set in a series of large distilleries. First announced on April 1, 2015, it was released later that month on April 28 and features a number of solo and group-oriented zones along with one raid zone designed for players at least level 100. The campaign requires the purchase of the Altar of Malice expansion, released five months earlier. Daybreak Games included both Rum Cellar and Alter of Malice together as a bundle, both with the standard or collector's edition of the expansion.

The Complete Collection
On October 22, 2009, Sony Online Entertainment released EverQuest II: The Complete Collection, a retail bundle which included the base game, the first three adventure packs, and the first six expansions up to The Shadow Odyssey. The package also came with 500 Station Cash to use in the in-game digital store, and 60 days of free game time. The Complete Collection was the fifth-highest-selling PC game in North America for the week of November 5-12, 2009.

References

EverQuest
Video game expansion packs
Video games developed in the United States
Windows games
Windows-only games